On a Good Day is the second album by the American singer-songwriter Jude Johnstone, released in 2005. 


Track listing
"On a Good Day" – 4:07
"20 Years" – 3:59
"Hard Lessons" – 4:24 
"Hold On" – 4:32
"In This House" – 3:36 
"Old and Gray" – 3:39 
"Evelyn" – 5:41
"Pen and Paper" – 3:38
"Deep Water" – 3:57
"Long Way Back" – 4:44
"The Hereafter" – 3:31

Personnel
 Jude Johnstone - vocals, piano
 Jackson Browne - vocals
 Julie Miller - vocals
 Rodney Crowell - vocals
 Bonnie Raitt - vocals
 Charles Duncan - guitar, organ 
 Mary Ramsey - viola
 Bob Liepman - cello
 Kevin McCormick - bass guitar
 Mauricio-Fritz Lewak - drums

Notes

External links 
Johnstone performing "On a Good Day" on The Saturday Early Show on CBS

2005 albums